The Ahmednagar Municipal Corporation is the governing body of the city of Ahmednagar in the Indian state of Maharashtra. The municipal corporation consists of democratically elected members, is headed by a mayor and administers the city's infrastructure, public services and police. Members from the state's leading various political parties hold elected offices in the corporation. Ahmednagar municipal corporation is located in Ahmednagar which was formed in the year 2003. Rohini Shendge (belonging to the Shivsena political party) is the current Mayor of Ahmednagar.

Revenue sources 

The following are the Income sources for the corporation from the Central and State Government.

Revenue from taxes 
Following is the Tax related revenue for the corporation.

 Property tax.
 Profession tax.
 Entertainment tax.
 Grants from Central and State Government like Goods and Services Tax.
 Advertisement tax.

Revenue from non-tax sources 

Following is the Non Tax related revenue for the corporation.

 Water usage charges.
 Fees from Documentation services.
 Rent received from municipal property.
 Funds from municipal bonds

List of Mayor

List of Deputy Mayor

List of Chairman, Standing Committee

Area of jurisdiction 
The Ahmednagar Municipal Corporation is comes under B-Class Municipal Corporation as Maharashtra State Rule. A.M.C consistently governs old city i.e. main city along with newly developed suburban area. The parts of city are

 Nagar (Head city)
 Savedi (Suburban)
 Kedgaon (suburban)
 Kotla
 Nagapur (Excluding M.I.D.C.)
 Bolhegaon
 Shivajinagar
 Govindpura
 Mukundnagar
 Tarakpur
 Bhutkarvadi
 Nalegaon
 Sarasnagar
 Burudgaon

Corporation Election 2018

Political Performance in Election 2018

Tasks
As per the CNC Act, 1948, the key responsibility for providing Ahmednagar's citizens basic urban services lies with the Ahmednagar Municipal Corporation. NMC is responsible for administering and providing basic infrastructure to the city.
 Intra-city transport service.
 Building and Maintenance of roads, streets and flyovers.
 Public Municipal schools
 Water purification and supply
 Hospitals
 Street lighting
 Maintenance of parks and open spaces
 Sewage treatment and disposal
 Garbage disposal and street cleanliness
 Urban development and city planning of new areas.
 Registering of births and deaths.

Administration
The corporation is headed by a Municipal commissioner, an IAS officer. He wields the executive power of the house. A quinquennial election is held to elect corporators to power. They are responsible for overseeing that their constituencies have the basic civic infrastructure in place, and that there is no lacuna on the part of the authorities. The mayor heads the party with the largest vote. A largely ceremonial post, he has limited duties.

Various departments such as public relations, library, health, finance, buildings, slums, roads, street lighting, traffic, establishment, gardens, public works, local audit, legal services, water works, education, octroi and fire services manage their specific activities. The activities of NMC are administered by its zonal offices.

 Street lighting
 Maintenance of parks and open spaces
 Sewage treatment and disposal
 Garbage disposal and street cleanliness
 Urban development and city planning of new areas.
 Registering of births and deaths.

References
Ahmednagar news

Ahmednagar
Municipal corporations in Maharashtra
Year of establishment missing
2003 establishments in Maharashtra